The men's 400 metres hurdles event at the 2013 Summer Universiade was held on 8–10 July.

Medalists

Results

Heats
Qualification: First 3 in each heat and 4 best performers advance to the Semifinals.

Semifinals
Qualification: First 3 in each heat and 2 best performers advance to the Semifinals.

Final

References 

Hurdles
2013